John Arthur (born 19 June 1994) is a Ghanaian professional footballer who plays as a midfielder.

Career 
Arthur began his career for Tarkwa United FC and joined in 2014 to Ebusua Dwarfs. After two years for Ebusua Dwarfs in January 2015 to Al Khartoum SC and Al Ahli SC (Khartoum) in 2016.

On January 10, 2017, Arthur joined Medeama SC as free agent and terminated his contract on a mutual agreement on October 15, 2018.

Position 
He is usually fielded as attacking midfielder.

References

1994 births
Living people
Association football midfielders
Ghanaian footballers
Ghana international footballers
Medeama SC players